is a former Japanese football player.

Playing career
Koda was born in Ehime Prefecture on September 12, 1969. After graduating from high school, he joined Mazda (later Sanfrecce Hiroshima) in 1988. Although he played as a midfielder, he did not play often in matches. In 1995, he moved to the Japan Football League club Vissel Kobe. He was converted to a right side back and became a regular player. In 1997, the club won second place and was promoted to the J1 League. However he did not play as much in 1998. In 1999, he moved to the new club Yokohama FC in the Japan Football League (JFL). He played often and the club won the championships for two years in a row (1999-2000) and the club was promoted to the J2 League. However hie did not play as much in 2001. In 2002, he moved to his local club Ehime FC in the JFL. He retired at the end of the 2003 season.

Club statistics

References

External links

biglobe.ne.jp

1969 births
Living people
Association football people from Ehime Prefecture
Japanese footballers
Japan Soccer League players
J1 League players
J2 League players
Japan Football League (1992–1998) players
Japan Football League players
Sanfrecce Hiroshima players
Vissel Kobe players
Yokohama FC players
Ehime FC players
Association football defenders